Schismatothele is a genus of South American tarantulas that was first described by Ferdinand Anton Franz Karsch in 1879.

Species
 it contains 9 species, found in Venezuela, Colombia, and Brazil:
 Schismatothele benedettii Panzera, Perdomo & Pérez-Miles, 2011 - Brazil
 Schismatothele hacaritama Perafán, Valencia-Cuéllar & Guadanucci, 2019 - Colombia
 Schismatothele inflata (Simon, 1889) (type) - Venezuela
 Schismatothele kastoni (Caporiacco, 1955) - Venezuela
 Schismatothele lineata Karsch, 1879 - Venezuela
 Schismatothele modesta (Simon, 1889) - Colombia
 Schismatothele olsoni Guadanucci, Perafán & Valencia-Cuéllar, 2019 - Colombia, Venezuela
 Schismatothele opifex (Simon, 1889) - Venezuela
 Schismatothele weinmanni Guadanucci, Perafán & Valencia-Cuéllar, 2019 - Colombia

See also
 List of Theraphosidae species

References

Theraphosidae genera
Spiders of South America
Theraphosidae